Metsweding District Municipality was, from 2000 until 18 May 2011, a district municipality in Gauteng province, South Africa. Metsweding, and its component local municipalities, was disestablished and absorbed into the Tshwane Metropolitan Municipality on the date of the 2011 municipal election.

The administrative seat of Metsweding was Bronkhorstspruit. The most spoken languages of its 159 861 people were IsiNdebele and Afrikaans (2001 Census).

Geography

Neighbours 
Metsweding was surrounded by:
 Waterberg (DC36) to the north
 Nkangala (DC31) to the east
 Ekurhuleni (East Rand) to the south-west
 Bojanala Platinum (DC36) to the north-west
 Tshwane (Pretoria) to the west, into which it was merged

Local municipalities 
The district contained the following local municipalities, which have also been abolished:

Demographics
The following statistics are from the 2001 census.

Gender

Ethnic group

Age

Politics

Election results 
Election results for Metsweding in the South African general election, 2004. 
 Population 18 and over: 109 820 [68.70% of total population] 
 Total votes: 59 426 [37.17% of total population] 
 Voting % estimate: 54.11% votes as a % of population 18 and over

References

External links

 Metsweding DM Official website
 Municipal Demarcation Board
 Stats SA Census 2001 page
 Independent Electoral Commission 2004 election results

 

Former district municipalities of South Africa